The Radio Club Paraguayo (RCP) (in English, literally Radio Club of Paraguay) is a national non-profit organization for amateur radio enthusiasts in Paraguay.  The RCP operates a QSL bureau for those amateur radio operators in regular contact with amateur radio operators in other countries, and supports amateur radio operating awards and radio contests.  Radio Club Paraguayo represents the interests of Paraguayan amateur radio operators before national and international regulatory authorities.  RCP is the national member society representing Paraguay in the International Amateur Radio Union.

See also 
International Amateur Radio Union

References 

Paraguay
Clubs and societies in Paraguay
Radio in Paraguay
Organisations based in Asunción